Erilophodes is a genus of moths in the family Geometridae described by Warren in 1894.

Species
 Erilophodes colorata Warren, 1894

References

Geometridae